Bruno Pires may refer to:

 Bruno Pires (cyclist) (born 1981), Portuguese cyclist
 Bruno Pires (footballer) (born 1992), Brazilian footballer

See also
 Bruno Peres (born 1990), Brazilian football right-back